Miller Airport  is a privately owned, public-use airport located three nautical miles (6 km) southwest of the central business district of Bluffton, in Wells County, Indiana, United States.

Facilities and aircraft 
It has two runways with turf surfaces: 9/27 is 2,600 by 100 feet (792 × 30 m) and 18/36 is 2,230 by 100 feet (680 × 30 m). For the 12-month period ending December 31, 2006, the airport had 2,616 general aviation aircraft operations, an average of 218 per month.

References

External links 

Airports in Indiana
Transportation in Wells County, Indiana
Buildings and structures in Wells County, Indiana